Solrød is a municipality in Region Sjælland on the east coast of the island of Zealand (Sjælland) in east Denmark.  The municipality covers an area of 40 km², and has a total population of 23,794 (2022).  Its mayor is Emil Blücher, a member of the Liberal Alliance political party. The municipal seat is Solrød Strand.

Overview
Most of the population lives in an urbanized belt between the coast of Køge Bay and the E47 motorway, developed in the 1970s. The northern part of the belt is Solrød Stand; this is the site of the municipal council. The southern part is Jersie Strand.
The coastal belt is connected by S-train to central Copenhagen to the north, and to the city of Køge to the south, with stations at Solrød Strand and Jersie Strand.

Further inland lies fertile farmland, dotted with the old villages of Karlstrup, Solrød, Jersie, Kirke Skensved, and Gammel Havdrup. The town of Havdrup has a station on the Lille Syd railway between Roskilde and Køge.

Neighboring municipalities are Greve to the north, Roskilde to the west, and Køge to the south.  To the east is Køge Bay (Køge Bugt).

There are popular beaches along the Køge Bay coast, and the municipality is a popular summer house area.  The area attracts both local day visitors and summer vacationers who are interested in boating, beaches and sunshine.

History

The 2007 municipal reform left the boundaries of Solrød unchanged.

Urban areas
There are four urban areas in the municipality:

and 
 Karlstrup

Politics

Municipal council
Solrød's municipal council consists of 19 members, elected every four years.

Below are the municipal councils elected since the Municipal Reform of 2007.

References 
 
 Municipal statistics: NetBorger Kommunefakta, delivered from KMD aka Kommunedata (Municipal Data)
 Municipal mergers and neighbors: Eniro new municipalities map

External links 

 

 
Municipalities of Region Zealand
Municipalities of Denmark
Copenhagen metropolitan area